Joseph Werbrouck (10 January 1882 – 3 June 1974) was a Belgian track cyclist who competed in the 1908 Summer Olympics. In 1908 he won the bronze medal in the 20 kilometres competition. He also competed in the 660 yards event but was eliminated in the first round.

References

External links
profile

1882 births
1974 deaths
Belgian male cyclists
Belgian track cyclists
Olympic cyclists of Belgium
Cyclists at the 1908 Summer Olympics
Olympic bronze medalists for Belgium
Olympic medalists in cycling
Place of birth missing
Medalists at the 1908 Summer Olympics